Aqa Nur-e Sehtan (also Romanized as Āqā Nūr-e Sehtan) is a village in Chubar Rural District, Ahmadsargurab District, Shaft County, Gilan Province, Iran. At the 2006 census, its population was 37, in 8 families.

References 

Populated places in Shaft County